Monroe-Woodbury High School is located in Central Valley, New York, part of the town and village of Woodbury in Orange County. It educates all students in grades 9-12 in the Monroe-Woodbury Central School District.

Notable alumni 

David Bernsley (born 1969), American-Israeli basketball player; principal of the high school
Lovie Simone, actress (Class of 2016): Greenleaf (TV series), Selah and the Spades, etc.
Andy Grammer, musician
Amy Gutmann, former president of the University of Pennsylvania and current U.S. ambassador to Germany
J. Michael Mendel, television producer (The Simpsons, Rick and Morty) 
Jermaine Paul, won The Voice in 2012
James Skoufis, New York state senator elected to office in 2018
Bull Dempsey, wrestler
John Trautmann, American long-distance runner
Shane Burgos, UFC Featherweight

Extra-curricular activities 
The Monroe Woodbury High School also boasts many extra-curricular activities, both athletic and academic, among them being Computer Club, Drama Club, Art Guild, Chess Club, History Club, Interact, Pep Band, Math Team, Mock Trial, Model UN, National Honor Society, a Newspaper, Odyssey of the Mind, Science Olympiads, and Student Government, and many more. In Sports, there are teams in Cheerleading, Football, Soccer, Tennis, Cross Country Running, Alpine Skiing, Track, Swimming, Golf, Volleyball, Lacrosse, Wrestling, Ice Hockey, Basketball, Baseball, and Softball.

The football team won the New York class AA state championship in 2005, and also appeared in the game in 2006, 2007, 2008, and 2013.

See also

Education in New York
List of high schools in New York

References

External links
 Official website

Public high schools in New York (state)
Schools in Orange County, New York
2001 establishments in New York (state)